Motasingha dirphia, the dirphia skipper, is a butterfly of the family Hesperiidae. It is found in the state of Western Australia.

The wingspan is about 40 mm. The Caterpillars are a translucent green with white spots, and have a pinkish thorax and tail, and a black head. The adults are dark brown, with cream spots on each fore wing. The males also have a broken black patch on the upper surface of each forewing. The undersides are reddish brown with cream spots, which are black-edged under each hind wing.

References

External links
 Australian Caterpillars

Trapezitinae
Butterflies described in 1868
Butterflies of Australia
Taxa named by William Chapman Hewitson